Essendon tram depot is located on Mount Alexander Road, Travancore, a suburb of Melbourne, Australia. Operated by Yarra Trams, it is one of eight tram depots on the Melbourne tram network. Despite the name, the depot is located three kilometres from the suburb of Essendon.

History
The Essendon tram depot was opened in 1906 by the North Melbourne Electric Tramway & Lighting Company. It passed with the company to the Melbourne & Metropolitan Tramways Board on 1 August 1922.

When the Public Transport Corporation was privatised in August 1999, Essendon depot passed to M-Tram. It passed to Yarra Trams when it took control of the entire tram network in April 2004.

Layout 
Essendon depot has 24 roads, 18 of which are covered in three sheds, the remaining six are in the open to the north of the sheds. It has access from Mount Alexander Road in both directions, and also features facilities for heavy maintenance.

Rolling stock
As at December 2019, the depot had an allocation of 73 trams: 44 B2 Class and 29 Z3 Class.

Routes
The following routes are operated from Essendon depot:
57: West Maribyrnong to City (Elizabeth Street) 
58: Coburg West to Toorak shared with Southbank depot
59: Airport West to City (Elizabeth Street) 
82: Moonee Ponds Junction to Footscray

References

Tram depots in Melbourne
Transport infrastructure completed in 1906
1906 establishments in Australia
Essendon, Victoria
Transport in the City of Moonee Valley
Buildings and structures in the City of Moonee Valley